Boglárka is a popular Hungarian female name meaning either "jewel" or "buttercup." It was the second most popular name for girls born in Hungary in 2007.

People
Boglárka Csemer (born 1986), Hungarian singer 
Boglárka Dallos-Nyers (born 1997), Hungarian singer
Boglárka Kapás (born 1993), Hungarian freestyle swimmer
Boglárka Megyeri (born 1987), Hungarian football midfielder
Boglárka Szabó, Hungarian football midfielder

Notes

Given names derived from plants or flowers
Hungarian feminine given names